The Larry O'Brien NBA Championship Trophy is the championship trophy awarded annually by the National Basketball Association (NBA) to the winner of the NBA Finals. The trophy originally kept the Walter A. Brown Trophy name of its predecessor until being renamed in 1984.  

The current design, depicting a basketball over a hoop and basket, was first awarded in 1977 still under its original name, which was changed in honor of former NBA commissioner Larry O'Brien who served from 1975 to 1984. Before joining the NBA, O'Brien was the United States Postmaster General under President Lyndon B. Johnson from 1965 to 1968.

History
A new trophy was created for the 1977 NBA Finals. The inaugural winners were the Portland Trail Blazers, who defeated Philadelphia 76ers in six games. Unlike the original championship trophy, the new trophy was given permanently to the winning team and a new one was made every year, similar to the Vince Lombardi Trophy, awarded annually to the winning team of the NFL's Super Bowl and the Commissioner's Trophy, awarded annually to the winning team of Major League Baseball's World Series. The 1982-83 76ers were the last team to win the Brown Trophy, sweeping the Los Angeles Lakers in 1983.

In 1984, the trophy was renamed to the Larry O'Brien Championship Trophy, in honor of Larry O'Brien, who served as NBA commissioner from 1975 to 1984. The Boston Celtics were the inaugural winners of the renamed trophy, defeating the Los Angeles Lakers in seven games in the 1984 NBA Finals.

Coming along a series of redesigned awards as part of its 75th anniversary season, the trophy design has been changed again. The most notable change is the two discs replacing the square foundation of the previous design. According to the designer of the new trophy, the square foundation was seen as an awkward way to hold the trophy, and the round discs will make it easier to carry and lift. The two discs function like the metal bands of the National Hockey League (NHL)'s Stanley Cup. The top disc shows the league's first 75 championship teams from 1947 to 2021, while the bottom disc will have the next 25 championship teams from 2022 to 2046, in time for the association's 100th anniversary. The resigned trophy's ball and net are also slanted to the right, or forward, to represent the league's continued desire to be progressive.

Description
The trophy is two feet tall and is made of 15.5 pounds of sterling silver and vermeil with a 24 karat gold overlay. The basketball depicted on top is the same size as a real basketball.  The trophy is manufactured by Tiffany & Co. The championship team maintains permanent possession of the trophy (although one exception exists, as described below). The year and winning team names are engraved on the trophies, and are often prominently displayed in the winning team's arena.

After the sale of the Houston Rockets from Leslie Alexander to Tilman Fertitta in late 2017, Alexander maintained the ownership of the team's 1993-94 and 1994-95 trophies as mementos of his ownership. Thus, the team commissioned Tiffany to create replica versions of both Larry O'Brien trophies (and replacing the 1993-94 trophy, which was unexpectedly dropped and dented by reserve center Richard Petruška during the celebration), which were publicly unveiled on September 20, 2018.

Promotion

Although the Larry O'Brien Trophy has been compared with the National Hockey League's Stanley Cup, it has never been as prominent as the NHL trophy. To reduce this discrepancy, the NBA has been actively promoting the O'Brien Trophy in recent years to generate more recognition and an iconic status for the trophy. The trophy appeared on past logos for the NBA Finals.  After the Detroit Pistons won the NBA Finals in 2004, the trophy was toured around the state of Michigan, marking the first time the trophy toured around the state of the winning team. In 2005, the NBA Legends Tour was launched in New York City. As part of the tour, the O’Brien Trophy was showcased in various cities—including those that were hosting the playoffs—for fans' autograph and photo sessions. It was escorted by many former players, including Julius Erving, Kareem Abdul-Jabbar and Bill Russell. In May 2007, the NBA unveiled the NBA Headquarters on Second Life, an Internet-based virtual reality environment. With this launch, fans could take pictures with the championship trophy in the virtual Toyota Larry O'Brien Trophy Room. In August, the trophy traveled to Hong Kong for the first time as part of the NBA Madness Asia Tour.

By franchise
This table lists the teams that have won the Larry O' Brien Championship Trophy since it was introduced in 1977. It includes trophies awarded before it was renamed in 1984. For a complete history of NBA championship teams, see List of NBA champions.

See also
List of NBA champions

References

External links

National Basketball Association awards
National Basketball Association Finals
Awards established in 1977